YMCA, sometimes regionally called the Y, is a worldwide youth organization based in Geneva, Switzerland, with more than 64 million beneficiaries in 120 countries. It was founded on 6 June 1844 by George Williams in London, originally as the Young Men's Christian Association, and aims to put Christian values into practice by developing a healthy "body, mind, and spirit".

From its inception, it grew rapidly and ultimately became a worldwide movement founded on the principles of muscular Christianity. Local YMCAs deliver projects and services focused on youth development through a wide variety of youth activities, including providing athletic facilities, holding classes for a wide variety of skills, promoting Christianity, and humanitarian work.

YMCA is a non-governmental federation, with each independent local YMCA affiliated with its national organization. The national organizations, in turn, are part of both an Area Alliance (Europe, Asia Pacific, the Middle East, Africa, Latin America and the Caribbean, the United States, and Canada) and the World Alliance of YMCAs (World YMCA). Consequently, all YMCAs are unique, while following certain shared aims, such as the Paris Basis.

The YMCA was also considered a parachurch organization based on Protestant values. Imitator organizations include the Young Women's Christian Association (YWCA), the Young Men's Hebrew Association (YMHA), and the Young Men's Buddhist Association (YMBA). It is also the subject of the 1978 song "Y.M.C.A." by the Village People.

History

Origins 

The Young Men's Christian Association (YMCA) was founded by George Williams and 11 friends. Williams was a London draper who was typical of the young men drawn to the cities by the Industrial Revolution. They were concerned about the lack of healthy activities for young men in major cities; the options available were usually taverns and brothels. Williams' idea grew out of meetings he held for prayer and Bible-reading among his fellow workers in a business in the city of London, and on 6 June 1844, he held the first meeting that led to the founding of YMCA with the purpose of "the improving of the spiritual condition of young men engaged in the drapery, embroidery, and other trades." Anthony Ashley-Cooper, 7th Earl of Shaftesbury served as YMCA's first president from 1851 until his death in 1885.

By 1845, YMCA started a popular series of lectures that from 1848 were held at Exeter Hall, London, and started being published the following year, with the series running until 1865.

YMCA was associated with industrialisation and the movement of young people to cities to work. YMCA "combined preaching in the streets and the distribution of religious tracts with a social ministry. Philanthropists saw them as places for wholesome recreation that would preserve youth from the temptations of alcohol, gambling, and prostitution and that would promote good citizenship."

Movement 

The YMCA spread outside the United Kingdom in part thanks to the Great Exhibition of 1851, the first in a series of World's Fairs which was held in Hyde Park, London. Later that year there were YMCAs in Australia, Belgium, Canada, France, Germany, the Netherlands, Switzerland, Hong Kong, and the United States.

The idea of creating a truly global movement with an international headquarters was led by Henry Dunant, Secretary of YMCA Geneva, who would later go on to found the International Committee of the Red Cross and win the first Nobel Peace Prize.  Dunant successfully convinced YMCA Paris to organise the first YMCA World Conference. The Conference took place in August 1855, bringing together 99 young delegates from nine countries, held before the Exposition Universelle (1855). They discussed joining in a federation to enhance cooperation amongst individual YMCA societies. This marked the beginning of the World Alliance of YMCAs. The conference adopted the Paris Basis, a common mission for all present and future national YMCAs. Its motto was taken from the Bible, "That they all may be one" (John 17:21).

Other ecumenical bodies, such as the World YWCA, the World Council of Churches, and the World Student Christian Federation have reflected elements of the Paris Basis in their founding mission statements. In 1865, the fourth World Conference of YMCAs, held in Germany, affirmed the importance of developing the whole individual in spirit, mind, and body. The concept of physical work through sports, a new concept for the time, was also recognized as part of this "muscular Christianity".

YMCA has cooperated with camping organizations such as Camp Fire (organization), Girl Scouts of the USA, and Boy Scouts of America. This lasted from 1989 to 2015.

Two themes resonated during the first World Conference: the need to respect the local autonomy of YMCA societies, and the purpose of YMCA: to unite all young, male Christians for the extension and expansion of the Kingdom of God. The former idea is expressed in the preamble:

1870s to 1910s 

YMCA was very influential during the 1870s and the 1930s, during which times it most successfully promoted "evangelical Christianity in weekday and Sunday services, while promoting good sportsmanship in athletic contests in gyms (where basketball and volleyball were invented) and swimming pools." Later in this period, and continuing on through the 20th century, YMCA had "become interdenominational and more concerned with promoting morality and good citizenship than a distinctive interpretation of Christianity." Starting before the American Civil War, YMCA provided nursing, shelter, and other support in wartime in the US.

In 1878, the World YMCA offices were established in Geneva, Switzerland by Dunant. Later, in 1900, North American YMCAs, in collaboration with the World YMCA, set up centres to work with emigrants in European ports, as millions of people were leaving for the US. In 1880, in Norway, YMCA became the first national organization to adopt a strict policy of equal gender representation in committees and national boards.

In 1885, Camp Baldhead (later known as Camp Dudley), the first residential camp in the United States and North America, was established by George A. Sanford and Sumner F. Dudley, both of whom worked for YMCA. The camp, originally located near Orange Lake in New Jersey, moved to Lake Wawayanda in Sussex County the following year, and then to the shore of Lake Champlain near Westport, New York, in 1891.

The YMCA was an early influence on scouting that began in the UK in 1907. The year after its inception by Robert Baden-Powell, the first scout troops met in the Nottingham and Birkenhead YMCA buildings. The YMCA would also influence the Boy Scouts of America (BSA) and German Scouting. Edgar M. Robinson, a Chicago-area YMCA administrator, worked at YMCA while also becoming the BSA's first director.

In 1916, K. T. Paul became the first Indian national general secretary of India. Paul had started rural development programs for self-reliance of marginal farmers, through co-operatives and credit societies. These programmes became very popular. He also coined the term "rural reconstruction", and many of the principles he developed were later incorporated into the Indian's government nationwide community development programs. In 1923, Y. C. James Yen, of YMCA China, devised the "thousand character system", based on pilot projects in education. The method also became very popular, and in 1923, it led to the founding of the Chinese National Association of the Mass Education Movement. In 1878, YMCA was organized near the Jaffa Gate of the Old City of Jerusalem and the current landmark building was dedicated by General Lord Allenby in 1933 during the British Mandate of Palestine.

By then, most of the YMCA had central offices in Gainesville, Florida; Tokyo, Japan; Denver, Colorado; and Madrid, Spain.

The World Wars 

Within ten days of the declaration of World War I, YMCA had established no fewer than 250 recreation centres, also known as huts, in the United Kingdom, and would go on to build temporary huts across Europe to support both soldiers and civilians alike, run by thousands of volunteers. Notable supporters and volunteers included Clementine Churchill (for which she was appointed a Commander of the Order of the British Empire (CBE) in 1918), Oswald Chambers and Robert and Olave Baden-Powell. Within the first month the YMCA Women's Auxiliary was formed, and Princess Helena Victoria of Schleswig-Holstein would go on to become a notable member and chairman of its organising committee.

During World War I, YMCA raised and spent over $155 million on welfare efforts for American soldiers. It deployed over 25,000 staff in military units and bases from Siberia to Egypt to France. They took over the military's morale and comfort operations worldwide. Irving Berlin wrote Yip Yip Yaphank, a revue that included a song entitled "I Can Always Find a Little Sunshine in the YMCA". Frances Gulick was a YMCA worker stationed in France during World War I who received a United States Army citation for valour and courage on the field.

During World War II, YMCA was involved in supporting millions of POWs and in supporting Japanese Americans in internment camps. This help included helping young men leave the camps to attend Springfield College and providing youth activities in the camps. In addition, YMCA was one of seven organizations that helped to found the USO.

In Europe, YMCA helped refugees, particularly displaced Jews. Sometimes YMCA participated in escape operations. Mostly, however, its role was limited to providing relief packages to refugees.

It was also involved in war work with displaced persons and refugees. It set up War Prisoners Aid to support prisoners of war by providing sports equipment, musical instruments, art materials, radios, gramophones, eating utensils, and other items.  Donald Lowrie of the YMCA took the helm of the Committee of Nîmes (also known as the Camps Committee), a group that gathered leaders from over twenty humanitarian organizations coordinate advocacy for people in the internment camps, including helping children leave these camps to live in children's colonies or eventually escape to freedom.

From the 1940s 

YMCA Motion Picture Bureau, renamed Association Films in 1946, was one of the UK's largest non-theatrical distribution companies. In 1947 the World YMCA gained special consultative status with the United Nations Economic and Social Council. In 1955 the first black President of the World YMCA, Charles Dunbar Sherman from Liberia, was elected. At 37 years, he was also the youngest president in World YMCA history. In 1959 YMCA of the USA developed the first nationally organized scuba diving course and certified their first skin and scuba diving instructors. By 1974, YMCA had set up a curriculum to begin teaching cave diving.

In 1973, the Sixth World Council in Kampala, Uganda, became the first World Council in Africa, hosted by Uganda YMCA. It reaffirmed the Paris Basis and adopted a declaration of principles, known as the Kampala Principles. It include the principles of justice, creativity and honesty. It stated what had become obvious:  that a global viewpoint was more necessary. It also recognized that YMCA and its national member organizations would have to take political stands, particularly in international challenges and crises.

In 1976, YMCA of the USA appointed Violet King Henry to executive director to its Organizational Development Group, making her the first woman named to a senior management position with the American national YMCA.

In 1985, the World Council of YMCAs passed a resolution against apartheid, and anti-apartheid campaigns were formed under the leadership of Lee Soo-Min (Korea), the first Asian secretary general of the World YMCA.

Challenge 21 and recent years 

In 1998, the 14th World Council of YMCAs in Germany adopted "Challenge 21", intended to place more focus on global challenges, such as gender equality, sustainable development, war and peace, fair distribution, and the challenges of globalization, racism, and HIV/AIDS.

In 2002, the World Council in Oaxtepec, Morelos, in Mexico, called for a peaceful solution to the Middle East crisis. On 12 July 2010, YMCA of the USA rebranded its name to the popular nickname "The Y" and revised the iconic red and black logo to create five colored versions. Today, YMCAs are open to all, regardless of ability, age, culture, ethnicity, gender, race, religion, sexual orientation and socioeconomic background.

During the 19th World Council meeting in 2018 in Chiang Mai, Carlos Sanvee from Togo became the first African and current Secretary General of World YMCA. During the same World Council meeting, Patricia Pelton from Canada emerged as the first female President of World YMCA.

YMCA's 175th anniversary in 2019 was celebrated with a global gathering of the organisation's young leaders at ExCeL London from 4 to 7 August, with 3,200 people from 100 countries. The event celebrated youth leadership, and elevated the United Nations Sustainable Development Goals. It was attended by guests including the Jayathma Wickramanayake on behalf of Office of the Secretary-General's Envoy on Youth and María Fernanda Espinosa, the President of the United Nations General Assembly.

Global structure 

A federated model of governance has created a diversity of YMCA programmes and services, with YMCAs in different countries and communities offering vastly different programming in response to local community needs. Financial support for local associations is derived from programme fees, membership dues, community chests, foundation grants, charitable contributions, sustaining memberships, corporate sponsors and other funding models used in the charitable sector.

YMCA globally operates on a federation model, with each independent local YMCA affiliated with its national organization, known as a National Council. The national organizations, in turn, are affiliated to both an Area Alliance (Europe, Asia Pacific, the Middle East, Africa, Latin America and the Caribbean, the United States, and Canada) and the World YMCA. The World YMCA is the highest affiliation body. Each local, national and regional YMCA is independent of each other, but local, regional and international cooperation, partnerships and collaborations are part of the organizations work. Each National Council is led by a National General Secretary, a role that is akin to that of a CEO. At each stage of the affiliation process, there are usually membership fees i.e. local YMCA to National Movement.

Ever since the first World Conference in August 1855, in Paris, the World YMCA has convened a World Conference (later renamed World Council) every three to four years and is YMCA's highest decision making forum. Every National Council sends a delegation who hold a number of votes, which are dependent on the financial turnover of that National Council. The World Council is "responsible for setting the policies and direction of the World YMCA, electing its Officers and Executive Committee, evaluating the work of the last four years, and deliberating on priorities for the next quadrennium". The next World Council will take place in 2022 in Aarhus, Denmark.

Logo 
 In 1881, 26 years after its foundation, the official emblem of the World Alliance of YMCAs was adopted, at the Ninth International YMCA World Conference, in London. The circular emblem is made up of five segments, one for each continent. The segments are held together by small monograms of YMCA in different languages. As early as 1881, YMCA leaders believed the Movement could be truly international and united across borders. In the center is a larger monogram of X and P, Chi and Rho, Christ's name, as used by early Christians. An open Bible sits on top of the monogram, showing John XVII, Verse 21, "that they all may be one". This was to remind YMCAs that Christ is at the center of the Movement, a source of strength, hope and unity, binding them all together.

In 1891, Luther Gulick (physician), a physical education director at YMCA of the US, introduced a new emblem to represent YMCA, an inverted red triangle. Each of the triangle's sides represented 'the whole man' and a different aspect of YMCA's work as recognised by Gulick; Mind, Body and Spirit. So significant was the red triangle, it would go on to become a familiar symbol of YMCA's work on the home front and around the world during WW1 and WW2. The red triangle is still used as part of many local, national and regional YMCA logos today.

In 2010, the YMCA of the USA changed its logo to "The Y" as part of a larger brand transformation.

Activities

Accommodation 
YMCAs around the world offer various types of accommodation. In some places this takes the form of budget accommodation available to the public such as youth hostels, or hotels which in turn generate income for other charitable activities. In England and Wales, YMCAs offer supported accommodation for vulnerable and homeless young people.

Education and academia 

Multiple colleges and universities have historically had connections to YMCA. Springfield College, of Springfield, Massachusetts, was founded in 1885 as an international training school for YMCA Professionals, while one of the two schools that eventually became Concordia University—Sir George Williams College—started from night courses offered at the Montreal YMCA. Northeastern University began out of a YMCA in Boston, and Franklin University began as YMCA School of Commerce. San Francisco's Golden Gate University traces its roots to the founding of YMCA Night School on 1 November 1881. Detroit College of Law, now the Michigan State University College of Law, was founded with a strong connection to the Detroit, Michigan YMCA. It had a 99-year lease on the site, and it was only when it expired that the college moved to East Lansing, Michigan. Youngstown State University traces its roots to the establishment of a law school by the local YMCA in 1908. The Nashville School of Law was YMCA Night Law School until November 1986, having offered law classes since 1911 and the degree of Juris Doctor since January 1927. YMCA pioneered the concept of night school, providing educational opportunities for people with full-time employment. Many YMCAs offer ESL programs, alternative high school, day care, and summer camp programs. In India, YMCA University of Science and Technology of Faridabad was founded in 1969. It offers various programs related to science and engineering. During the 1880s, the Cleveland YMCA began to offer day and evening courses to students who did not otherwise have access to higher education. The YMCA program was reorganized in 1906 as the Association Institute, and this in turn was established as Fenn College in 1929. In 1964, Fenn College became a state college named Cleveland State University.

American high school students have a chance to participate in YMCA Youth and Government, wherein clubs of children representing each YMCA community convene annually in their respective state legislatures to "take over the State Capitol for a day."

American students in Title One public schools are sometimes eligible to join a tutoring program through YMCA called Y Learning. This program is used to help low-income students who are struggling in school complete their homework with help from tutors and receive a snack as well as a safe place to be after school. Y Learning operates under the main mission of bridging achievements gaps and providing essential resources to help underprivileged students thrive in school.

The International Coalition of YMCA Universities brings together universities from all over the world, including Brazil, England, Germany, Hong Kong, India, Mexico, Uruguay, United States, and Venezuela. The universities offer a wide variety of courses on different levels.

Health and wellbeing 

In 1891, James Naismith, a Canadian American, invented basketball while studying at YMCA International Training School in Springfield, Massachusetts (later to be named Springfield College). Naismith had been asked to invent a new game in an attempt to interest pupils in physical exercise. The game had to be interesting, easy to learn, and easy to play indoors in winter. In 1895, William G. Morgan from YMCA of Holyoke, Massachusetts, invented the sport of volleyball as a slower-paced alternative sport, in which the older YMCA members could participate. In 1930,  from YMCA of Montevideo, Uruguay, invented the sport of futsal, an indoor version of football, having been created in synthesis with the rules of the three indoor sports of handball, basketball and water polo.

Public health 
The organization is committed to public health in different ways. It organizes fitness and wellness as well as help and awareness programs. One of the programs is the Diabetes Prevention Program, where trained staff members help sick persons to make their lives healthy and active.

Basketball

Basketball was invented at YMCA, in Springfield, Massachusetts, in 1891 by Dr. James Naismith, a clergyman, educator and physician. Naismith was asked to create an indoor "athletic distraction" to keep rowdy youth busy in the cold New England winter months. Luther Gulick (physician), the head of Springfield YMCA gave Naismith two weeks to come up with a game to occupy a particularly incorrigible group. Naismith decided the game had to be physically active, simple to understand and would have minimal physical roughness.

The first contest was played at the International YMCA Training School in December 1891. During those earliest games the school's custodian, "whose antipathy to the students was well known," retrieved successful shots from the baskets – using a ladder. The original game was played with a soccer ball and two peach baskets nailed to the balcony of Springfield YMCA. The game was an immediate hit, although originally the baskets still had their bottoms, and the ball had to be manually retrieved after each score, considerably slowing play. It was mostly a passing game, and dribbling did not become a major part of the game until much later, when the ball was improved to its present form.

Gulick worked with Naismith to spread the sport, chairing the Basketball Committee of the Amateur Athletic Union (1895–1905) and representing the United States Olympic Committee during the 1908 Olympic Games. Naismith and his wife attended the 1936 Summer Olympics when basketball was included for the first time as an Olympic event. For his efforts to increase the popularity of basketball and of physical fitness in general, Gulick was inducted into the Basketball Hall of Fame as a contributor in 1959.

Volleyball
Four years after James Naismith invented basketball in Springfield in 1891, William G. Morgan, an instructor at YMCA in Holyoke, Massachusetts, wanted to create a game for older gentlemen which had less physical contact. He borrowed a tennis net, raised it 6 feet, 6 inches above the floor, and invented the game of "mintonette", which could be played by a group of any number and involved volleying a large ball over the net. An observer suggested that a better name for the new sport would be "volleyball".

Racquetball
Racquetball is another YMCA invented sport. Joseph Sobek a tennis, handball and squash player who worked in a rubber manufacturing factory, was dissatisfied with the options for indoor sports in Greenwich, Connecticut. He could not find squash players of his caliber and he did not care particularly for handball, so in 1950 he designed a short, stringed racquet, used a children's toy rubber ball, and created rules for a new game using the handball courts. He called his new sport "paddle rackets". The sport really took off in the 1970s and there are an estimated 15 million players worldwide today.

Gymnastics

Gymnastics came to be at the YMCA in 1869. Three YMCAs; Boston, San Francisco, and New York (23rd St Branch) all built buildings with gyms inside. These gyms then allowed men to train on the sport of gymnastics. Although, most of the men who knew gymnastics were circus performers and did not fit the ideas and values of the YMCA. Robert J. Roberts was one of the original circus performers at the Boston YMCA in the 1870s and 1880s but he got hurt due to a fall and could not perform or teach gymnastics. This led him to start the group exercises we see at the YMCA today. Even though Robert stopped teaching gymnastics in Boston another YMCA was creating the sport of gymnastics, the Salem YMCA was holding boy/men classes as far back as 1895 where they could learn parallel and horizontal bars, "German horse," mat exercises, juggling, and weight lifting. They would then train to perform for an audience. A few years later, gymnastics began to filter out of the YMCA due to group sports such as volleyball and basketball becoming more popular among the crowds. Gymnastics as we know it today started at the Marblehead/Swampscott YMCA which is also in Massachusetts. Compared to the other YMCAs who were stopping the sport of gymnastics held group classes in their basketball gym. They had to break down their equipment each day until their program was moved to the Salem State College in 1990. Salem State had recently dropped their college team and the youth director at the YMCA went to see about expanding their program by renting the colleges space. Since then two of the Marblehead/Swampscott gymnasts have gone on to be named all-American gymnasts and placed in the top five at the National Championships. The team has also placed in the top 10 at several National Championships.

YMCAs around the world now offer gymnastics to boys and girls of a variety of ages. Equipment now ranges from the men's events of pommel horses, parallel bars and the men's high rail to the uneven bars, balance beams, vault systems and trampolines. These YMCAs now offer camps, lessons and teams in gymnastics and cheerleading and tumbling. "Since the Y was founded, gymnastics, in its many forms, has been a big part of the YMCA. From fitness to fun, the girls and boys who participate in the programs learn skills, flexibility and goal setting through personal achievement and team accomplishments. The Y is committed to nurturing children and teens who participate in this historic sport. Whether kids aspire to be Olympians or just enjoy the physical fun, the Y is proud to have had such an impact on the sport over the last 150 years."

Futsal 

"Futsal" started in 1930 when Juan Carlos Ceriani [fr], a teacher in Montevideo, Uruguay, created a version of indoor football for recreation in YMCAs. This new sport was originally developed for playing on basketball courts,[5] and a rule book was published in September 1933. Football was already highly popular in the country and after Uruguay won the 1930 World Cup and gold medals in the 1924 and 1928 Summer Olympics, it attracted even more practitioners. Ceriani's goal was to create a team game that could be played indoor or outdoor but that was similar to football.

The YMCA spread the game immediately throughout South America. It was easily played by everyone, everywhere, and in any weather condition, without any difficulty, helping players to stay in shape all year round. These reasons convinced João Lotufo, a Brazilian, to bring this game to his country and adapt it to the needs of physical education.

Camping 

YMCA camping began in 1885 when Camp Baldhead (later known as Camp Dudley) was established by G.A. Sanford and Sumner F. Dudley on Orange Lake in New Jersey as the first residential camp in North America in operation today. The camp later moved to Lake Champlain near Westport, New York.

Camping also had early origins in YMCA movement in Canada with the establishment in 1889 of Big Cove YMCA Camp in Merigomish, Nova Scotia. The Montreal YMCA organization also opened a summer camp named Kamp Kanawana nearby in 1894. In 1919 YMCAs began their Storer Camps chain around the country.

Publishing 
 YMCA founded YMCA Press publishing house in Russia in 1900. It moved to Paris after World War I, where it focused on providing intellectual and educational works to Russian émigrés. 

YMCA Press published some of Aleksandr Solzhenitsyn's books while he was imprisoned by the Russian government.

Religion 
The first YMCA included Bible studies, although the organization has generally moved on to a more holistic approach to youth work. Around six years after its birth, an international YMCA conference in Paris decided that the objective of the organization should become "Christian discipleship developed through a program of religious, educational, social and physical activities" (Binfield 1973:265).

Europe

United Kingdom and Ireland 

YMCA in the United Kingdom and Ireland consists of three separate National Councils: England & Wales, Ireland, and Scotland. YMCAs in Wales joined YMCA England in 2017, leading to England’s National Council being renamed to YMCA England & Wales. 

YMCAs in England and Wales offer supported accommodation for vulnerable and homeless young people, mental health services, youth clubs, sports centres, nursery schools and family support and after school clubs. Across England and Wales, YMCA supports more than 18,000 young people with homes each year, and is thus one of the largest providers of safe supported accommodation for young people. The vast majority of this accommodation is supported by a range of personal, social and educational services.

The archive of YMCA England & Wales is housed at the University of Birmingham Special Collections. The archive of YMCA Scotland is available at the National Archives of Scotland.

Germany 

In Germany (as well as Austria and Switzerland) YMCA is called CVJM, which stands for Christlicher Verein junger Menschen (Christian Association of Young People). Up until 1985 the organisation was called 'Christlicher Verein Junger Männer' (Christian Association of Young Men), the name change reflected its activities being accessible to men and women.

Sweden 
YWCA-YMCA of Sweden (Swedish: KFUK-KFUM Sverige) was established in 1966 following a merger of YMCA of Sweden and the YWCA of Sweden. In 2011, the organization decided to use the term KFUM Sverige during promotion where M now stands for människor ("people") instead of män (men) as before. YWCA-YMCA of Sweden has 40,000 members in 140 local associations. Several Swedish YWCA-YMCA associations have been successful in sport.

North America 

The first YMCA in North America opened in Montreal, Quebec, Canada, on 25 November 1851.

United States 

In the United States, YMCA is more commonly known as 'The Y' with its national office headquartered in Chicago. It has 800 separate organisational entities affiliated to its national office, based in 2,700 branch locations, working with 21 million people, to "strengthen communities through youth development, healthy living and social responsibility." It has about 19,000 staff and 600,000 volunteers.

Its major programs include after-school activities, day care, youth work and physical fitness. A large number of its service locations have gyms, weight rooms, swimming pools, and sports courts where basketball and other sports are played.

The first YMCA in the United States opened on 29 December 1851, in Boston, Massachusetts. It was founded in 1851 by Captain Thomas Valentine Sullivan (1800–59), an American seaman and missionary. In 1853 the Reverend Anthony Bowen founded the first YMCA for Colored Men in Washington, D.C. The renamed Anthony Bowen YMCA is still serving the U Street area of Washington. It became a part of YMCA of the city of Washington in 1947. Through the middle part of the 20th century it was associated with homosexual subculture, with the athletic facilities providing cover for closeted individuals.

YMCAs in the USA have been one of the largest charitable nonprofits in the United States, in terms of donations received from the general public, as listed by Forbes magazine. YMCA in the USA is one of the many organizations that espouses muscular Christianity.

Its national archives are located at the Kautz Family YMCA, a unit of the University of Minnesota Libraries Department of Archives and Special Collections.

Activities 

Activities at the YMCA in the United States include aquatics, arts and humanities, camps, child care, family activities, health and fitness, and various sports.

Aquatics ranges from recreational classes to competitive swimming. Classes are offered for parent-child, preschool, youth, family, teen and adult. As well as there are arthritics classes and other water therapies. Certain YMCA's also offer a special Olympic swim class or swim team. CPR and first aid classes are offered to not only their employees but to the public to take as well. Away from swim classes, individuals can also take water polo lessons, water fitness lessons, or take part in the open swim times where families can swim in a lane to themselves.

Arts and humanities at the YMCA is lessons for the members or non-members of the Y to take. These lessons range from visual arts (ceramics, drawing, painting, photography), performing arts (music, dance, poetry), and literacy arts (reading, storytelling, public readings). These programs are not offered at each YMCA but the ones who have same to offer these programs give a benefit to their communities to give children a safe place to go to enjoy such activities.

Camping at the YMCA is various day camps offered throughout the summer and winter breaks. These day camps are for youth and teens for them to spend a summer/winter in a safe environment staying active. There are outdoor camps where they do outdoor activities such as swimming, walking trails, etc., indoor camps that range from cooking to different sports (basketball, gymnastics, volleyball). There are also camps offered for special needs individuals, sailing camps, and family camps. Teens can also take part in the camp counselor program where they learn about being a part of a program during one part of their day and then they are a junior camp counselor in one of the various camps the remainder of the day.

Child Watch or Child Care is a safe place at the YMCA where parents can leave their child while they work out or attend a class. They offer infant, toddler, preschool and school age care. Since COVID-19, child watch is offered in various time slots compared to in the past where it was offered with full day availability. The children are able to play with other children indoors with toys or outdoors on a playground to stay active.

Family programs available are family nights, parent-child classes, and different events put on by the YMCA. These events could range from a trick or treating event, where parents can bring their child to trick or treat at the YMCA or a parent-child gymnastics class.

Health and Fitness at the YMCA includes group exercise, lifestyle classes, personal training, strength training, weight management, and youth fitness. Group classes offered are cycling classes, aerobics, and kickboxing. Members can take part in programs such as the Loose Big which is a program where individuals can work out with a group and a trainer to improve their lifestyle and lose weight. Youth fitness classes include swim, gymnastics, basketball, etc.

Sports at the YMCA that are offered range from baseball, basketball, gymnastics, football, wrestling, karate, volleyball, soccer, and racquetball. The programs offered depend on the location of the YMCA and the amount of space they have for the various programs. These programs are also offered to different age groups such as preschool, youth, teen, and special needs. The goal of the YMCA is to offer these activities to all populations.

Parent/child programs 
YMCA's parent/child programs, under the umbrella program called Y-Guides, (originally called YMCA Indian Guides, Princesses, Braves, and Maidens) have provided structured opportunities for fellowship, camping, and community-building activities (including craft-making and community service) for several generations of parents and kids in kindergarten through eighth grade.

After-school programming 
YMCA after-school programs are geared towards providing students with a variety of recreational, cultural, leadership, academic, and social skills for development.

Residences 

Until the late 1950s, YMCAs in the United States were built with hotel-like rooms called residences or dormitories. These rooms were built with the young men in mind coming from rural America and many foreign-born young men arriving to the new cities. The rooms became a significant part of American culture, known as an inexpensive and safe place for a visitor to stay in an unfamiliar city (as, for example, in the 1978 Village People song "Y.M.C.A."). In 1940, there were about 100,000 rooms at YMCAs, more than any hotel chain. By 2006, YMCAs with residences had become relatively rare in the US, but many still remain.
YMCA of Greater Seattle turned its former residence into transitional housing for former foster care and currently homeless youth, aged 18 to 25. This YMCA operates six transitional housing programs and 20 studio apartments. These services are offered at their Young Adult drop-in center in Seattle, Washington.

Canada 
YMCA Canada was established over 160 years ago as a charity.  Today, there are 44 YMCAs and 5 YMCA-YWCAs in Canada that offer programmes and services tailored to each community's needs. Together they serve 2 million people in more than 1,000 communities across Canada.
Available programs include
 Children and Youth
 Health, Fitness and Recreation
 Childcare
 Day and Resident Camping
 Employment Training
 Community Outreach and Newcomer Services
 International Development and Education
 Leadership Development and Recognition

YMCA financial assistance programs help to make YMCA accessible to everyone.

Its archives are held by Library and Archives Canada. Until 1912, when Canadian YMCAs formed their own national council, YMCAs were jointly administered by the International Committee of the Young Men's Christian Associations of North America.

Mexico 
Mexico's first YMCA branch opened in Mexico City in 1902 for the American community. By 1904, there were two more branches in Mexico City and one branch established in Monterrey. In 1907, another branch in Chihuahua was set up and then one YMCA in Tampico. In Mexico, YMCA organized physical activity, individual development, and national progress. There was advertising for YMCA programs that would help young men gain life skills and YMCA also had some activities for women. For example, an excursion to Xochimilco in 1910 featured races for boys and girls and indoor baseball for everyone. Although, YMCA had very little influence on rural Mexico until after the Mexican Revolution.

Panama 

In 1904, a letter was written by the chief engineer of the Panama Canal Zone, John Findley Wallace, to Admiral J.G. Walker, chairman of the Isthmian Canal Commission, recommending that YMCA be brought to the Canal Zone. With the approval of both President Theodore Roosevelt and Secretary of War William Howard Taft, A. Bruce Minear, an experienced secretary, was sent to organize the association work in the Canal Zone. Construction was started on YMCA clubhouses in Culebra, Empire, Gorgona, and Cristobal, Panama, as well as in Panama City. These clubhouses were operated by YMCA for several years and were financed by the Canal Zone, they contained billiard rooms, an assembly room, a reading room, bowling alleys, dark rooms for the camera clubs, gymnastic equipment, an ice cream parlor and soda fountain, and a circulating library. By 1920, there were nine buildings in operation in the Canal Zone.

Panama YMCA was founded on 24 May 1966. The 1968 impeachment of President Marco Aurelio Robles and the ensuing riots and political unrest impacted YMCA's work and the after-school programs at Panama YMCA were cancelled. Use of the school equipment, such as the pool and gym, greatly helped YMCA's ability to continue on with the swimming classes and summer programs. These programs remained popular throughout this time.

In 1983, planning was started for the integration of Panama YMCA and the American Services YMCA (ASYMCA). The integration of the remaining two ASYMCAs, the Balboa Branch and the Cristobal Branch, with the Panama Branch, a merger that was completed in 1990.

YMCA Panama continues its work for the betterment of today's society. In 2005, YMCA Panama inaugurated the new YMCA Panama School located on Colinas del Sol, in the Nuevo Chorrillo District of Arraijan.

South America

Argentina 
YMCA developed in 1902 in Argentina, where it provided support for physical education teachers. YMCA was most notable in encouraging women's sports in South America, and during the early 1900s, YMCA in Argentina highly promoted basketball, swimming, and track and field. There were many victories for the development of sports in Argentina due to YMCA, such as Frederick Dickens, who served as the director of physical education at the Buenos Aires YMCA. Dickens eventually led the Argentine Olympic delegation to Paris in 1924 and Amsterdam in 1928.

Brazil 
YMCA developed in 1893 in Brazil and volleyball was deemed appropriate for women from the beginning. Through the encouragement of YMCA, physical educators promoted women's volleyball in schools like Escola Wenceslau Braz and Colégio Sylvio Leite in Rio. Sports clubs even began to organize events for women because of YMCA's influence.

Peru 
YMCA Peru has a team of 200 employees and a voluntary body of more than 700 people. The organization describes its mission as "Having a positive impact on the young people so they have the will to transform the Peruvian society".
YMCA Peru was created on 17 May 1920. It has presence in the departments of Lima, Arequipa, and Trujillo.

Africa 

YMCAs in Africa are united under the Africa Alliance of YMCAs (AAYMCA). The core focus of the organizational work done by the AAYMCA is youth empowerment. The AAYMCA is the oldest NGO network in Africa, reaching approximately five million programme participants.  The first YMCA in Africa was established in Liberia in 1881, and the AAYMCA was founded in 1977 as the umbrella body for all national movements on the continent. The AAYMCA collaborates with national movements to conduct research, develop localized as well as continental programming, monitor and evaluate progress, and communicate impact of youth development work undertaken on the continent. From 2015, the Africa Alliance of YMCAs has aligned much of its programmatic work to some of the goals set out by the African Union's Agenda 2063 Development Plan in order to contribute towards the achievement of the ideals envisioned by the African Renaissance.

Subject to Citizen Change Model 
Many of the Africa YMCA projects and programmes are influenced by the Subject to Citizen (S2C) Change Model. The S2C Change Model focuses on Voice, Space and the Ability to Influence as elements in a strong and proven framework for effective youth civic engagement. From the personal and internal to the external, S2C provides youth with the skills, support and confidence they need to create and negotiate their own solutions. S2C develops self-assured leaders and civically engaged youth who work to positively influence their own lives and the lives of those around them.

African YMCA movements 
Active movements: Angola, Côte d'Ivoire, Cameroon, Egypt, Ethiopia, Ghana, Kenya, Uganda, Liberia, Madagascar, Nigeria, Senegal, Sierra Leone, South Africa, Tanzania, The Gambia, Togo, Zambia, Zimbabwe

Associate movements: Niger, Rwanda, South Sudan

Movements in formation: Malawi, Namibia

Asia Pacific

Hong Kong 
YMCA Hong Kong was established in 1901, being separated into two separate organizations in 1908, split across linguistic lines: "YMCA of Hong Kong" and "Chinese YMCA of Hong Kong". YMCA Hong Kong headquarters has occupied its current location at 22 Salisbury Road, Tsim Sha Tsui since 1922. YMCA Hong Kong established the College of Continuing Education in 1996 and YMCA of Hong Kong Christian College in 2003.

Middle East

Jerusalem

In 1924, Archibald Clinton Harte, General Secretary of the International YMCA, raised the sum of one million dollars towards the construction of the building. The Jerusalem YMCA was dedicated in 1933 with the words “Here is a place whose atmosphere is peace, where political and religious jealousies can be forgotten and international unity be fostered and developed.” Harte's home on the shores of Galilee was bequeathed to the Jerusalem International YMCA as an international conference facility. The cornerstone was laid in 1928 by Lord Plumer, the British High Commissioner for Palestine, on a plot of land in the West Nikephoria section of Jerusalem, purchased from the Greek Orthodox Patriarchate of Jerusalem.The building was designed by the American architect Arthur Loomis Harmon of Shreve, Lamb and Harmon, who designed the Empire State Building. The Jerusalem YMCA housed the city's first heated swimming pool and first gymnasium with a wooden floor. The first concert broadcasts of the Voice of Israel radio station were transmitted from the YMCA auditorium.

In 1947, the YMCA was the venue of the UNSCOP talks leading up to the UN Partition Plan. At the end of April 1948 the building was taken over by the International Red Cross, sheltering around 80 refugees. Two months later it was used by the UN Mediation Committee headed by Count Bernadotte and in September it was taken over by the US Consulate with US guards and naval telecommunications equipment. The building was restored to the YMCA in April 1949.

Nobel Peace Prize laureates 
 1901: Henry Dunant, who co-founded the Geneva YMCA in 1852 and was one of the founders of the World YMCA, was awarded the first-ever Nobel Peace Prize for founding the International Committee of the Red Cross in 1863, and inspiring the Geneva Conventions (Conventions de Genève). He shared the prize with Frédéric Passy, founder and president of the first French peace society.
 1946: John R. Mott, US, president of the World YMCA, was awarded the Nobel Peace Prize for his "long and fruitful labors in drawing together the peoples of many nations, many races and many communions in a common bond of spirituality." John R. Mott also played an important role in the founding of the World Student Christian Federation in 1895, the 1910 World Missionary Conference and the World Council of Churches in 1948.

See also 
 Y.M.C.A. (song)
 Clean living movement
 List of recreational organizations
 List of YMCA buildings
 New York Society for the Suppression of Vice
 Polish YMCA
 TUXIS
 YMCA of Greater New York
 YMCA SCUBA Program
 Police Citizens Youth Club

References

Citations

Sources and further reading 
 Alleman, Nathan F., and Dorothy E. Finnegan. "'Believe you have a mission in life and steadily pursue it': Campus YMCAs presage student development theory, 1894–1930." Higher Education in Review 6.1 (2009): 33+ online.
 Baker, William J. "To Play or to Pray? The YMCA Question in the United Kingdom and the United States, 1850-1900". International Journal of the History of Sport 1994 11#1: 42-62 
 Fischer-Tiné, Harald, Stefan Huebner and Ian Tyrrell, eds. Spreading Protestant Modernity: Global Perspectives on the Social Work of the YMCA and YWCA (c. 1889–1970) (University of Hawai’i Press, 2020) abstract.
 Garnham, Neal. "'Both praying and playing:' Muscular Christianity" and the YMCA in north-east county Durham." Journal of Social History 35.2 (2001): 397-407, in England. online
 Hopkins, Charles Howard. History of the YMCA in North America (Association Press, 1951), a standard scholarly history History of the Y.M.C.A. in North America.
 Hosgood, Christopher P. "Negotiating Lower-Middle-Class Masculinity in Britain: The Leicester Young Men's Christian Association, 1870-1914." Canadian Journal of History 37.2 (2002): 253–274.
 Lord, Alexandra M. "Models of masculinity: sex education, the United States Public Health Service, and the YMCA, 1919–1924." Journal of the history of medicine and allied sciences 58.2 (2003): 123–152. online
 Macleod, David I. Building character in the American boy: The Boy Scouts, YMCA, and their forerunners, 1870-1920 (Univ of Wisconsin Press, 2004), a standard scholarly history.
 
 Putney, Clifford W. "Going Upscale: The YMCA and Postwar America, 1950-1990". Journal of Sport History 20#2 1993, pp. 151–166. online
 Vertinsky, Patricia, and Aishwarya Ramachandran. "The 'Y' Goes to India: Springfield College, Muscular Missionaries, and the Transnational Circulation of Physical Culture Practices". Journal of Sport History 46#3 2019, pp. 363–379. online
 Watson, Nick J., Stuart Weir, and Stephen Friend. "The development of muscular Christianity in Victorian Britain and beyond." Journal of religion and society 7 (2005) pp 7–21.online.
 Winter, Thomas. "Personality, Character, and Self-Expression: The YMCA and the Construction of Manhood and Class, 1877-1920." Men and Masculinities 2.3 (2000): 272–285.

Primary sources

External links 

 Additional archives about the importance of YMCA to Chicago , IL and to the African American History.

 
Protestant organizations
Christian organizations
Hostels
Men's organizations
Organisations based in Geneva
Organizations established in 1844
Christian temperance movement
Homeless shelters in the United Kingdom
International nongovernmental organizations
1844 establishments in England
Men's religious organizations